This is the discography for American hip hop recording artist briefly known as King Chip, better known as Chip Tha Ripper.

Studio albums 
Gift Raps (2011)  
CleveLAfornia (2015) 
Bonfire with Lex Luger (2022)

EPs 
From Me to You: The Prelude to Gift Raps (2010)

Mixtapes 
Money (2007) 
Can't Stop Me (2008)
The Cleveland Show (2009)
Independence Day (2010)
Tell Ya Friends (2012)
44108 (2013)
Thornhill (2017)

Singles

As lead artist

As featured artist

Guest appearances

References 

Discographies of American artists
Hip hop discographies